Nick Bloom (16 February 1930 – 7 June 2011) was an  Australian rules footballer who played with St Kilda in the Victorian Football League (VFL).

Notes

External links 

1930 births
2011 deaths
Australian rules footballers from Victoria (Australia)
St Kilda Football Club players
Port Melbourne Football Club players